August Mortelmans (24 April 1901 – 8 October 1985) was a Belgian racing cyclist. He won the Belgian national road race title in 1927.

References

External links

1901 births
1985 deaths
Belgian male cyclists
Cyclists from Flemish Brabant
People from Boutersem